Sang Hyun Lee (born 1938) was the Kyung-Chik Han Professor of Systematic Theology at Princeton Theological Seminary, and director of the institution's Program for Asian American Theology and Ministry.  He specializes in systematic theology, Asian American theology, Jonathan Edwards, and God and the problem of evil. He holds a Bachelor of Sacred Theology from Harvard Divinity School and a Ph.D. from Harvard University.

Publications
 The Philosophical Theology of Jonathan Edwards (Princeton University Press, 1988)
 The Works of Jonathan Edwards, volume 23, Writings on the Trinity, Grace, and Faith (Yale University Press, 2003)
 The Princeton Companion to Jonathan Edwards (Princeton University Press, 2005)
 From a Liminal Place: An Asian American Theology (Fortress Press, 2010)

References

External links
Faculty page at Princeton Theological Seminary

American theologians
American writers of Korean descent
Harvard Divinity School alumni
Princeton Theological Seminary faculty
South Korean emigrants to the United States
1938 births
Living people